Miss Grand Paraguay 2023 will be the sixth edition of the Miss Grand Paraguay beauty pageant, scheduled to be held on April 2, 2023, at the Paseo Events Center, Asunción. Candidates chosen through either the regional pageants or national preliminary casting will compete for the title. The contest's winner will be crowned by Miss Grand Paraguay 2022, Agatha Leon of Ciudad del Este, and gain the right to represent the country at Miss Grand International 2023, to be held in Vietnam on October 25.

Background
After the end of the Miss Grand Paraguay 2022 contest in May 2022, the pageant organizer, MGM Productions, consequently announced to accept of the department licensees responsible to held a regional contest to elect the representative and also ran the first central casting on 17 September, to select the national finalists for the 2023 edition of the contest, each of finalists qualified through the casting was later assigned to represent one of the country's administrative divisions.

Selection of contestants

The following is a list of local preliminary contests for the Miss Grand Paraguay 2023 beauty pageant.

Contestants 
As of February 2023, 25 delegates have been confirmed to participate.

References

External links

 

Miss Grand Paraguay
Grand Paraguay